Horace Douglas Millward (10 July 1931 – 23 October 2000) was an English former professional footballer. During his career he made over 100 appearances for Ipswich Town.

He coached Baltimore Bays and Baltimore Comets.

References

External links 
Doug Millward at Pride of Anglia

1931 births
2000 deaths
Footballers from Sheffield
Association football forwards
Doncaster Rovers F.C. players
Ipswich Town F.C. players
Southampton F.C. players
Poole Town F.C. players
English football managers
St Mirren F.C. managers
North American Soccer League (1968–1984) coaches
Scottish Football League managers
English footballers
English Football League players